Inquisitor taivaricosa is a species of sea snail, a marine gastropod mollusk in the family Pseudomelatomidae, the turrids and allies.

Description
The length of the shell varies between 25 mm and 50 mm.

Distribution
This marine species occurs off the Philippines and in the South China Sea.

References

 Liu J.Y. [Ruiyu] (ed.). (2008). Checklist of marine biota of China seas. China Science Press. 1267 pp.
 Chang CK, Wu WL. 2000. The Taiwan inquisitors (Gastropoda: Turridae). Bull Malacol Taiwan. 24:13–26.

External links
 MNHN : specimen
 Gastropods.com: Inquisitor taivaricosa
 

taivaricosa
Gastropods described in 2000